Thomas K. Finletter Academics Plus School is a historic school located in the Olney neighborhood of Philadelphia, Pennsylvania. It is part of the School District of Philadelphia. The building was designed by Irwin T. Catharine and built in 1929–1930. It is a three-story, eight bay yellow brick building on a raised basement in the Art Deco-style. It features a colorful arched entryway with terra cotta trim and terra cotta panels. It was named for the judge  Thomas K. Finletter.

The building was added to the National Register of Historic Places in 1988.

References

External links

School buildings on the National Register of Historic Places in Philadelphia
Art Deco architecture in Pennsylvania
School buildings completed in 1930
Olney-Oak Lane, Philadelphia
Public K–8 schools in Philadelphia
School District of Philadelphia
1930 establishments in Pennsylvania